Berriz is a town and municipality in the province of Biscay, Basque Country, northern Spain.

It may also refer to:
Elicio Berriz (1820–1890), Spanish soldier and Mayor of Ponce, Puerto Rico
Juan de los Ríos y Berriz (1631–1698), Peruvian Roman Catholic prelate
Martín Ruiz de Gamboa de Berriz (1533–1590), Spanish Basque conquistador

Basque-language surnames